Microcramboides is a genus of moths of the family Crambidae.

Species
Microcramboides chaparellus Bleszynski, 1967
Microcramboides meretricella (Schaus, 1913)

References

Natural History Museum Lepidoptera genus database

Crambini
Crambidae genera
Taxa named by Stanisław Błeszyński